Krists Straume (born 13 May 1986) is a Latvian sprint canoer who has competed since the late 2000s. At the 2008 Summer Olympics in Beijing, he competed with Kristaps Zaļupe and finished seventh in the K-2 1000 m event while being eliminated in the semifinals of the K-2 500 m event. He qualified for 2012 Summer Olympics along with countryman Aleksejs Rumjancevs, where they finished 11th in the K-2 200 m event.

References

External links
 LOK profile
 

1986 births
Sportspeople from Riga
Canoeists at the 2008 Summer Olympics
Canoeists at the 2012 Summer Olympics
Latvian male canoeists
Living people
Olympic canoeists of Latvia